Hedleyhope Fell is a nature reserve to the north-east of Tow Law, County Durham, England. It occupies the steep slope on the right bank of Hedleyhope Burn, between the stream and the B6301 Tow Law–Cornsay Colliery road.

The reserve is common land and forms part of Hedleyhope Fell and Cornsay Common.

References

External links
 

Nature reserves in County Durham
Nature reserves of the Durham Wildlife Trust